SACO is an initialism that may refer to:

 Ingeniero Aeronáutico Ambrosio L.V. Taravella International Airport's ICAO code
 SACO Apartments, a UK-based vacation rental company
 Sino-American Cooperative Organization, a World War II–era treaty for cooperation between the United States and Republic of China
 South African Computer Olympiad, an annual computer programming competition for secondary school students
 Special Action Committee on Okinawa, an agreement between the United States and Japan in 1995 to develop new rules to govern U.S. military bases on Okinawa
 SACO (Colombia), or Colombian Air Service, an airline that operated from 1933 to 1940
 St Augustine Chamber Orchestra, a chamber orchestra in Trinidad and Tobago
 SACO Defense, now General Dynamics, a U.S. defense conglomerate
 Swedish Confederation of Professional Associations (SACO)
 SACO Hardware, Saudi Arabian hardware retailing and wholesaling business

See also
 Saco (disambiguation)